Sybra yokoi is a species of beetle in the family Cerambycidae. It was described by Skale and Weigel in 2014.

References

yokoi
Beetles described in 2014